Alec James Southwell  (1 November 1926 – 26 January 2018) was a judge from 3 April 1979 until 11 April 1997 in the Supreme Court of Victoria, which is the highest ranking court in the Australian State of Victoria. At the time of his retirement, Southwell was believed to be Australia's longest-serving judge.

Early life
Southwell was educated at Melbourne Grammar School and the University of Melbourne.

Southwell served with the Royal Australian Naval Reserve in New Guinea and Morotai in the later part of World War II.

Legal career
He was appointed a Queen's Counsel in 1968 and a County Court judge in 1969.

Southwell was part of the full bench that quashed a conviction of Michael Glennon for charges of paedophilia while he was a Catholic priest. Southwell was the dissenting judge who held that the decision could lead to a situation where adverse media publicity could prevent someone from ever facing trial. The situation had been precipitated by Derryn Hinch had used his radio program to campaign against Glennon.

Following retirement
Following his retirement, he remained a reserve judge of the Supreme Court of Victoria and a member of the Legal Profession Tribunal which considers disciplinary cases against lawyers until 2001.

In 2002, Southwell was appointed by the Roman Catholic Church to investigate accusations of sexual abuse against Archbishop George Pell.

See also
 Judiciary of Australia
 List of judges of the Supreme Court of Victoria
 Southwell inquiry
 Victorian Bar Association

References

Judges of the Supreme Court of Victoria
2018 deaths
1926 births
Australian King's Counsel